The Wailing is a 2016 South Korean horror film written and directed by Na Hong-jin and starring Kwak Do-won, Hwang Jung-min, Chun Woo-hee. The film centers on a policeman who investigates a series of mysterious killings and illnesses in a remote Korean village called Gokseong in order to save his daughter. The film was both a commercial and critical success.

Plot
After a mysterious Japanese man and his Cane Corso dog arrive in Gokseong, a small village in the mountains of South Korea, a mysterious infection breaks out and causes the villagers to become deranged and violently kill their families.

One night at the police station, a naked woman appears outside. The next day, the police find the woman has become infected and murdered her family. Officer Jong-goo meets a mysterious young woman called Moo-myeong (“no name” in Korean), who tells him that the Japanese man is the culprit, and is actually an evil spirit.  When Jong-goo steps away for a moment, Moo-myeong vanishes and a demonic figure with glowing red eyes ambushes him; he awakens in his bed.

A local hunter tells Jong-goo and Officer Oh Seong-bok that he saw the stranger, with glowing red eyes, eating from a deer carcass in the forest. As he continues to experience disturbing dreams about the demonic figure, Jong-goo decides to question the stranger. He enlists the help of his nephew, a Japanese-speaking deacon named Yang I-sam (“two-three” in Korean). They investigate the stranger's house in the forest, discovering a shrine containing photographs of murdered villagers, as well as some of their belongings. On the way home, Seong-bok shows Jong-goo a shoe that belongs to Jong-goo's daughter, Hyo-jin. Hyo-jin becomes sick, displaying symptoms similar to the infected. Jong-goo returns to the stranger's house, but learns that the evidence has been burned. Infuriated, he smashes up the worship room, kills the stranger's guard dog, and orders the stranger to leave the village.

Jong-goo's family discovers the bloody body of a dead goat hanging in front of their gate. Jong-goo experiences partial paralysis, and his wife and mother-in-law take him to see an acupuncturist. They return home to find that Hyo-jin has stabbed her neighbor to death. Distraught about Hyo-jin, Jong-goo's mother-in-law seeks help from a shaman, Il-gwang. Il-gwang believes that an evil spirit has possessed Hyo-jin, but is unable to exorcise it. After learning that Jong-goo disturbed the stranger, whom Il-gwang says is a demon, he prepares a death-hex ritual. At the same time, the stranger performs a ritual in his home with a photograph of another victim, Park Choon-bae. Both the stranger and Hyo-jin experience excruciating pain as Il-gwang's ritual progresses. Panicking, Jong-goo stops the ritual and takes his daughter to the hospital. The stranger, having narrowly survived the death-hex, sees Moo-myeong outside his house.

The following day, Jong-goo gathers his companions to hunt down the stranger. As they search his house, they are attacked by the reanimated corpse of Park Choon-bae, who injures Yang I-sam, giving the stranger time to flee. The stranger sees Moo-myeong watching him from afar. As Jong-goo's group drives back down the mountain, the stranger's body suddenly lands on the windshield. They dump it off a cliff as Moo-myeong watches. Jong-goo returns to find Hyo-jin's health has improved.

Il-gwang drives to Jong-goo's house, where he encounters Moo-myeong and vomits blood. After his ritual fails, he leaves town in terror but a swarm of flying insects stops him. He calls Jong-goo, warning him that Moo-myeong is the real demon, and the stranger was a shaman who was trying to kill her. Meanwhile, the wounded Yang I-sam receives news that his uncle Oh Seong-bok has killed his family.

Hyo-jin disappears. While searching for her, Jong-goo meets Moo-myeong, who claims the stranger is still alive, she has set a trap for the demon, and that Il-gwang is secretly cooperating with him. Jong-goo asks if she is a human or a ghost, and she gives a cryptic answer. Jong-goo notices she is wearing the personal items of the victims, including his daughter's hairpin. Believing this to be proof she is responsible, he returns home before the third cry of the rooster, nullifying Moo-myeong's trap. He discovers that Hyo-jin has murdered his wife and mother-in-law; she then attacks him. Il-gwang arrives and takes photographs of Jong-goo's dead family as Hyo-jin sits in a trance. As Jong-goo lays dying, he remembers happier times with his daughter and assures her that he will protect her.

Yang I-sam returns to the stranger's house with a sickle and a cross. He finds the stranger, alive, inside a nearby cave, and accuses him of being a demon. The stranger photographs Yang I-sam, then assumes his true appearance—that of the red-eyed demon—and taunts him.

Deleted ending
In a deleted scene happening right after the conclusion of the story, the Japanese man is seen sitting on a bench by the roadside. He spots a family on the other side of the road and invites a child to him by offering her candies. The mom picks up the kid before she manages to reach the stranger. A car driven by Il-gwang picks up the Japanese man before leaving. In the center of the road, Moo-myeong witnesses the car fading away in the horizon.

Cast

Kwak Do-won as Jong-goo, policeman and father of Hyo-Jin.
Hwang Jung-min as Il-gwang, a shaman hired to protect the village.
Chun Woo-hee as Moo-myung, the woman in white.
Jun Kunimura as a Japanese stranger.
Kim Hwan-hee as Hyo-jin, Jong-goo's daughter.
Her Jin as Jong-goo's mother-in-law.
Jang So-yeon as Jong-goo's wife.
Kim Do-yoon as Yang I-sam, a Japanese-speaking deacon.
Son Gang-guk as Oh Seong-bok, Jong-goo's police partner.
Park Sung-yeon as Kwon Myeong-joo.
Kil Chang-gyoo as Park Choon-bae
Jeon Bae-soo as Deok-gi.
Jeong Mi-nam as Heung-gook.
Choi Gwi-hwa as Byeong-gyoo.
Lee Seon-hee as Byeong-gyu's wife.
Jo Yeon-hee as Bar hostess.
Baek Seung-cheol as Friend.
Kwon Hyeok-joon as Friend.
Park Chae-ik as Friend.
Kim Gi-cheon as Dispatch captain.
Yoo Soon-woong as Chief of police.
Jo Han-cheol as Detective 1.
Kim Song-il as Police.
Bae Yong-geun as Police.
Im Jae-il as Police.
Lee In-cheol as Father.
Jo Seon-joo as Bar hostess.
Lee Chang-hoon as Doctor.
Kim Ji-won as Nurse.

Release and reception

Release 
The Wailing was released in South Korea on May 12, 2016. The film was shown in the Out of Competition section at the Cannes Film Festival in France on May 18, and was released in the United States on May 27. The film was then released on Netflix at a later date, though it has since been taken off the streaming service. The Wailing was released on other streaming services like Fandango Now, VUDU, Hulu, and Apple TV.

Critical response
The Wailing received widespread critical acclaim. On review aggregator website Rotten Tomatoes, the film has an approval rating of 99% and an average rating of 8/10, based on 82 critical reviews. The site's critics consensus reads, "The Wailing delivers an atmospheric, cleverly constructed mystery whose supernatural thrills more than justify its imposing length." On review aggregator website Metacritic, the film has a weighted average score of 81 out of 100 based on 19 critics, indicating "universal acclaim".

Jada Yuan of Vulture.com described the film as "operating on a level that makes most American cinema seem clunky and unimaginative". Anton Bitel of Little White Lies commented "By turns funny and despairing, this village noir brings the horror of uncertainty." Leah Pickett of Chicago Reader stated "the film justifies its epic length, meshing ancient east Asian mythology and rituals (village gods, exorcisms by shamans) with more recognizable horror tropes (demonic possession, zombification, the devil represented by a black dog and rams' heads) in a way that feels novel and unpredictable. The actors are uniformly strong..." Phil Hoad of The Guardian wrote "The layers of dissembling and self-dissembling pile up so thickly that not only does Na evidently touch on something integral about the nature of evil, but actually seems to be in the process of summoning it before your eyes." Financial Times'''s Nigel Andrews wrote "Very crazy, very Korean, very long: 156 minutes of murder, diabolism, exorcism and things that go bump by day and night". Clark Collins of Entertainment Weekly gave the film B+ grade, stating "Despite its epic length, The Wailing never bores as Na slathers his tale with generous supplies of atmosphere and awfulness". Jason Bechervaise of Screen Daily noted "The Wailing is initially set up as a thriller and the supernatural setting also helps deliver moments akin to a horror feature, particularly when a strange woman (Chun Woo-hee) first appears. But the film’s gradual progression into something more sinister puts a different spin on Na’s masterful use of pacing". Jacob Hall of /Film commented "The Wailing as it exists would involve burning the very structure of a traditional western movie to the ground. It’s why the movie is so great and it’s also why a remake seems so strange".

Deborah Young of The Hollywood Reporter added "As dark and pessimistic as the rest of South Korean thrill-master Na Hong Jin’s work, The Wailing (Goksung, a.k.a. The Strangers in France) is long and involving, permeated by a tense, sickening sense of foreboding, yet finally registers on a slightly lower key than the director’s acclaimed genre films The Chaser (2008) and The Yellow Sea (2010), both of which also got their start in Cannes." Maggie Lee of Variety noted "There’s nothing scarier than not knowing what you should be scared of. “The Wailing” erupts with a string of gruesome deaths in an insular village, but the investigation unleashes a greater terror — that of the paranoid imagination." David Ehrlich of IndieWire stated "“The Wailing” boasts all the tenets and tropes of a traditional horror movie, but it doesn’t bend them to the same, stifling ends that define Hollywood’s recent contributions to the genre. The film doesn’t use sound to telegraph its frights a mile away (there are no jump scares, here... well, maybe one), nor does it build its scenes around a single cheap thrill. On the contrary, this is horror filmmaking that’s designed to work on you like a virus, slowly incapacitating your defenses so it can build up and do some real damage. There’s a looseness here that’s missing from mainstream American horror, a sense that absolutely anything can happen next (and always does)." Aja Romano of Vox gave the film four points out of five, stating "The Wailing is the most unsettling Korean horror film in years, but it offers more chills than answers."

Lincoln Michel of GQ wrote "At just over two-and-a-half-hours long, The Wailing definitely takes its time, yet you could never describe it as a slow burn. This is a horror film that jumbles up ghosts, zombies, body horror, Eastern exorcism, Christian mythology, demonic curses, creepy children, and a lot more into one sustained narrative. This description may make it sound like the movie is a messy mash-up, but director Na Hong-jin ties it all together seamlessly. Instead of being a mess, the combination of tropes makes each individual one feel both fresh and terrifying." James Hadfield of The Japan Times'' gave the movie four stars out of five, writing "“The Wailing” veers from police drama to ghost story to zombie horror and back again, while tossing a generous helping of shamanism and Christian symbolism into the mix. At times, it resembles “The Exorcist” transplanted to the South Korean countryside; at others, it’s closer in tone to “Memories of Murder,” Bong Joon-ho’s masterful, slow-burning serial-killer drama".

Awards and nominations

References

External links 

2016 films
2016 horror films
2016 psychological thriller films
2010s supernatural horror films
2010s mystery thriller films
2016 horror thriller films
2010s Korean-language films
South Korean horror thriller films
South Korean mystery thriller films
South Korean supernatural horror films
South Korean psychological horror films
Folk horror films
20th Century Fox films
Demons in film
Films about curses
Films about spirit possession
South Korean zombie films
2010s South Korean films